Amsacta marginalis is a moth of the family Erebidae. It was described by Francis Walker in 1855. It is found in Ghana, Malawi, Nigeria, Sierra Leone and Togo.

References

Moths described in 1855
Spilosomina
Moths of Sub-Saharan Africa
Lepidoptera of West Africa
Lepidoptera of Malawi